"New York / N.Y." is a song by German artist Nina Hagen from her album Angstlos. Co-written by Hagen, Karl Rucker and Steve Schiff, it was released as the record's lead single in 1983. The song was later included on Hagen's compilation albums 14 Friendly Abductions, Definitive Collection, Prima Nina in Ekstasy and The Very Best of Nina Hagen. Nina Hagen raps in the English and the German version of the song. Only the refrain "New York, New York", which is repeated several times, is sung by her.

Track listing
 "New York / N.Y." – 3:36
 "Was es ist" – 4:19

In popular culture
In 2003, the song was featured in the American biographical comedy-drama film Party Monster.

Canadian electronic musician and performance artist Peaches references and sings a snippet of the song in the music video for her song "Show Stopper", which features Danish film actress Charlotte Munck.

Charts

References

1983 songs
1983 singles
Nina Hagen songs
CBS Records singles
Songs about New York City